The chestnut-sided shrike-vireo (Vireolanius melitophrys) is a species of bird in the family Vireonidae. It is found in Guatemala and Mexico. Its natural habitat is subtropical or tropical moist montane forests.

References

chestnut-sided shrike-vireo
Birds of Mexico
Birds of Guatemala
chestnut-sided shrike-vireo
chestnut-sided shrike-vireo
Taxonomy articles created by Polbot
Birds of the Sierra Madre del Sur
Birds of the Trans-Mexican Volcanic Belt